Ziopera porazz or Poraz may refer to:

 Avraham Poraz (born 1945, Bucharest), an Israeli lawyer and politician
 Nir Poraz (‎ 1971 - 1994), Israeli Defence Forces Captain
 Poraż, a village in the administrative district of Gmina Zagórz, Sanok County, Poland

Hebrew-language surnames